Capperonnier is a French surname. Notable people with the surname include:

 Claude Capperonnier (1671–1744), French scholar
 Jean Capperonnier (1716–1775), French scholar, nephew of Claude

French-language surnames